Kushchyovsky (masculine), Kushchyovskaya (feminine), or Kushchyovskoye (neuter) may refer to:
Kushchyovsky District, a district of Krasnodar Krai, Russia
Kushchyovskaya, a rural locality (a stanitsa) in Krasnodar Krai, Russia